Austin Scott Barnes (born December 28, 1989) is an American professional baseball catcher for the Los Angeles Dodgers of Major League Baseball (MLB). He played college baseball for the Arizona State Sun Devils. Barnes was selected by the Florida Marlins in the eighth round of the 2011 Major League Baseball draft. He made his MLB debut with the Dodgers in 2015 and helped the team win the 2020 World Series. In addition to catching, Barnes has also played as an infielder.

Early life 
Barnes was born on December 28, 1989, in Riverside, California, the oldest of four children born to Dennis and Stephanie Barnes. Although his mother is Mexican-American, he was raised speaking only English. His maternal uncle, Mike Gallego, played in Major League Baseball (MLB) for the Oakland Athletics. He began playing baseball at a young age. As a shortstop in Little League Baseball, Barnes' nickname was "Hoover", given for his ability to field ground balls.

He attended Riverside Polytechnic High School, playing on the same baseball team as future Houston Astros outfielder Jake Marisnick. He received four varsity letters from Riverside Poly, and served as team captain his senior year. As a junior in 2007, Barnes had a batting average of .450, which he improved to .478 as a senior. Outside of his high school team, Barnes played on travel teams and in a summer league, which he helped take to the American Amateur Baseball Congress (AABC) Don Mattingly Championship in 2017.

College career 
After graduating from Riverside Poly, Barnes attended Arizona State University to play college baseball. He largely did not play during his freshman season. He appeared in 20 games as a catcher and second baseman, with one start as a designated hitter. In only 17 at bats, Barnes totaled seven hits for a .412 average.

Things began to change for Barnes as a sophomore. After catchers Xorge Carrillo and Andrew Pollak both suffered injuries during Barnes' sophomore season, he was called behind the plate. Barnes adapted to the new position quickly, with 19 of the first 24 baserunners he faced caught stealing. He also improved his batting, finishing the season with a .272 average. He started in 48 games, 43 of which were behind the plate, and earned registered a .985 fielding percentage in his first season as a full-time catcher.

Barnes was given an opportunity to return to the infield for his junior season, but he elected to remain the team's catcher. His first home run of the season came on March 27, 2011, in the seventh inning of an 8-1 victory over Arizona. As the team's starting catcher, Barnes played in 43 games in 2011, starting in 41, and boasted a .994 fielding percentage and .320 batting average, with 27 runs and 15 runs batted in (RBIs). He was also named to the All-Pac-10 First Team upon the conclusion of the season.

Professional career

Minor league career 
The Miami Marlins drafted Barnes in the ninth round of the 2011 MLB Draft. He made his professional debut that season with the Class A Short Season Jamestown Jammers of the New York–Penn League, establishing himself early on as both a passionate catcher and a strong batter.

From 2012 to 2014 he played for the Greensboro Grasshoppers, Jupiter Hammerheads and Jacksonville Suns. He split time between catcher and second base.

Los Angeles Dodgers

On December 10, 2014, Barnes was traded to the Los Angeles Dodgers, along with Chris Hatcher, Andrew Heaney, and Enrique Hernández, in exchange for Dan Haren, Dee Gordon, Miguel Rojas and cash. He was assigned to the AAA Oklahoma City Dodgers. On May 23, 2015, he was called up to the Major Leagues for the first time when Yasmani Grandal went on the 7-day DL with a concussion.

Barnes made his MLB debut as the starting catcher for the Dodgers on May 24, 2015, originally wearing number 65. He had one hit in three at-bats in his debut, with his first MLB hit being a single to center field off of Dale Thayer of the San Diego Padres. He returned to Oklahoma City after his short time on the Dodgers roster and was named as a starter on the Pacific Coast League team for the mid-season Triple-A All-Star game. He was also named to the post-season PCL all-star team and Baseball America's Triple-A All-Star team. He rejoined the Dodgers in September. He played in 20 games for the Dodgers with six hits in 29 at-bats (.207). In 81 games for the Oklahoma City team, he hit .315 with nine homers and 42 RBI.

Barnes appeared in 21 games for the Dodgers in 2016, hitting .156, and 85 games for Oklahoma City, hitting .295. He changed his number from 65 to 28. He also appeared in two games in the 2016 National League Division Series against the Washington Nationals, with one pinch hit appearance and one pinch run appearance.

Barnes made the Opening Day roster as the backup catcher in 2017.  On June 30, 2017, he recorded his first multi-homer game of his career (his first career grand slam and a three-run home run) and recorded a career-high seven RBIs against the San Diego Padres. He gradually saw more playing time, moving into a platoon role with Grandal for most of the season before taking over as the starter in the playoffs. During the regular season, he had a .289 batting average with eight home runs and 38 RBI in 102 games. In the 2017 NLDS Barnes had four hits in eight at-bats with a home run and a double in the Dodgers' three-game sweep of the Arizona Diamondbacks. In the 2017 NLCS against the Chicago Cubs, he had two hits in 15 at-bats, and in the 2017 World Series against the Houston Astros, he had four hits in 23 at-bats. 

In 2018, Barnes started spring training battling elbow discomfort. He ended up being the backup to Yasmani Grandal, taking over the catching role more in the postseason when Grandal allowed two passed balls and made two errors in game 1 of the NLCS and another passed ball in game 3, resulting in Dodgers fans booing him and begging for Barnes to catch. Barnes hit .205/.329/.290 in 100 games with 4 home runs, 41 hits, and 14 RBI. An elite framer, he excelled defensively. He ranked third in the MLB for framing and defensive statistics, had a .993 fielding percentage, and allowed only one passed ball. In the 2018 NLCS against the Milwaukee Brewers, Barnes had two hits in 18 at-bats. In the 2018 World Series against the Boston Red Sox, he was hitless in eleven at-bats.

In 2019, Barnes was named the Opening Day starting catcher after Grandal signed with the Milwaukee Brewers. However, he got off to a slow start and on July 26 he was sent down to Oklahoma City to make room for rookie catcher Will Smith to take over the everyday catching duties. Barnes was batting .196 prior to being sent down. He appeared in only 75 games in the majors in 2019, hitting .203/.293/.340 with five home runs and 25 RBIs, while he hit .264 in 23 games in the minor leagues. Barnes signed a one-year, $1.1 million, contract with the Dodgers after the season, avoiding arbitration. 

During the pandemic-shortened 2020 season, Barnes appeared in 29 games for the Dodgers, hitting .244/.353/.314 with one homer and nine RBIs. In the postseason, Barnes was the starting catcher for each of Clayton Kershaw's starts and in the World Series caught Walker Buehler as well. He had two hits in three at-bats in the Wild Card Series, two hits in two at-bats in the NLDS and two hits in seven at-bats in the NLCS. In the 2020 World Series against the Tampa Bay Rays, he had two hits in 13 at-bats. In Game 3, he drove in a run with a safety squeeze and also hit a home run, becoming only the second player to do both of those things in the same World Series game, joining Héctor López in 1961. The Dodgers won the World Series in six games with Barnes catching the final out with Julio Urias closing the game.

On February 15, 2021, Barnes signed a new two-year, $4.3 million, contract with the Dodgers, to avoid salary arbitration. He again was the back-up catcher behind Will Smith, appearing in 77 games and hitting .215 with six homers and 23 RBI. He had three appearances, all as a pinch hitter, in the playoffs, striking out in two of the three at-bats.

On July 3, 2022, Barnes and the Dodgers signed a two-year contract extension worth $7 million. In 62 games in 2022, he hit .212 with eight homers and 26 RBIs.

Personal life
Barnes is the nephew of former MLB infielder Mike Gallego. His younger brother, Griffin, played catcher for Grand Canyon University and signed with the Los Angeles Angels. 

Barnes married Nicole Breanna Rappaport on January 20, 2018. The couple now live in Glendale, California, a suburb of Los Angeles close to Dodger Stadium. They have one son, born in February 2021.

Although Barnes' childhood nickname was "Hoover," it is now "Barnsey." He also picked up the nickname "Sam" from Chase Utley. 

Barnes enjoys playing golf in his free time.  His favorite actor is Will Ferrell, his favorite movie is Old School, and his favorite TV show is Seinfeld.

References

External links

Arizona State Sun Devils bio

1989 births
Living people
Major League Baseball catchers
Los Angeles Dodgers players
Jamestown Jammers players
Greensboro Grasshoppers players
Jupiter Hammerheads players
Jacksonville Suns players
Oklahoma City Dodgers players
Rancho Cucamonga Quakes players
Arizona State Sun Devils baseball players
Baseball players from Riverside, California
Anchorage Bucs players
St. Cloud River Bats players
Riverside Polytechnic High School alumni
American baseball players of Mexican descent
2023 World Baseball Classic players